Sarah Clotworthy Stevenson (1824–1885) was the wife of former Governor of West Virginia William E. Stevenson and served as that state's First Lady from 1869 to 1871.  She was born in 1824 in Philadelphia, Pennsylvania. In 1842, she married William E. Stevenson. In the 1850s, the Stevensons moved from Pittsburgh, Pennsylvania to Parkersburg, West Virginia where Mr. Stevenson became a staunch pro-Union and West Virginia statehood activist.  During her husband's term, in 1870, the capital was relocated from Wheeling to Charleston. After leaving office, the Stevensons returned to Parkersburg, West Virginia.  She died at Parkersburg in 1885.

References

1824 births
1885 deaths
People from Philadelphia
First Ladies and Gentlemen of West Virginia